Vilagos may refer to:

Penny Vilagos (born 1963), Canadian synchronized swimmer
Világos, Hungarian name of Șiria, a Romanian commune
Surrender at Világos